First Squeeze! is the first studio album by Japanese girl idol group Juice=Juice. It was released on 15 July 2015 on the label Hachama.

Release 
The album was released in three versions: a regular edition and two limited editions (Limited Edition A and Limited Edition B). The Limited Edition A included an additional Blu-ray disc, while the Limited Edition B included an additional DVD.

Chart performance 
The album debuted at number 5 in the Japanese Oricon weekly albums chart.

Track listing

Charts

References

External links 
 Profile of the album on the official website of Hello! Project
 Profile of the album on the official website of Up-Front Works

Juice=Juice albums
2015 debut albums
Hachama albums
Japanese-language albums